Malye Ozerki is a rural locality (a village) in Arkhangelskoye Rural Settlement, Sokolsky District, Vologda Oblast, Russia. The population was 6 as of 2002.

Geography 
The distance to Sokol is 19 km, to Arkhangelskoye is 4 km. Bolshiye Ozerki is the nearest rural locality.

References 

Rural localities in Sokolsky District, Vologda Oblast